The Upper Harz Water Tunnels are part of the Upper Harz Water Regale - a network of reservoirs, ditches, tunnels and other structures in the Harz mountains of central Germany. The German term Wasserlauf refers to the underground element (i.e. the tunnels) of the network of watercourses used in the historic silver mining industry of the Upper Harz. This network of ditches and tunnels was used to supply the mines with headrace waters for their water wheels from the 16th century onwards.

Construction 

Although explosives were already in use in the 17th century in the mines of the Upper Harz, tunnels continued to be hewn out by hand, that is with hammer and chisel for much longer. The reason was that there were difficulties in determining the right amount of gunpowder and fears that tunnels running just under the surface would collapse or that the explosive would produce fissures in the rock causing water to leak away. Almost all water tunnels were driven by counter-heading. Until the 18th century the miners excavated tunnels by following the weakest rock; this sometimes created a zigzag route that deviated significantly from the direct line. Not until the 19th century were tunnels driven in a strictly direct line using explosives.

The incline necessary to create a flow of water often amounted to less than 1% (in other words less than  drop for every  of length).

Compared with ditches, tunnels had the important advantage that the water flowing through them underground could not freeze up. The tunnels were laid primarily to short cut the long ditch runs around mountains. Such cuts also produced a steeper incline (shorter distances descending the same height difference have a steeper slope). This raised the flow velocity and hence the hydraulic capacity of the watercourse. The disadvantage of tunnels was the high investment cost of building them.

List of working Upper Harz water tunnels 
The working tunnels shown in this table follow the order in the latest listing by Preussag, which is based on their use in the various power stations.

List of disused Upper Harz water tunnels 
"Disused" refers to all those tunnels that are no longer in service. Some of these are completely preserved; others, however, have largely fallen into ruin. The following list makes no claim to being complete.

See also 

 Upper Harz
 Upper Harz Water Regale
 Upper Harz Ponds
 Upper Harz Ditches
 Mining in the Upper Harz
 Rösche - generic German mining term for water tunnels

Sources

External links 
 Information by the Harzwasserwerke

Tunnels in Germany
 
Kunstgraben